Anya (stylized as ANYA) is a 2019 science fiction film directed by Jacob Akira Okada and Carylanna Taylor. It features actors Ali Ahn, Gil Perez-Abraham, and Motell Gyn Foster. The film follows a couple struggling with infertility issues as they discover some unique genetic traits related to an immigrant group from the fictional island of Narval.

Production 
Anya revolves around the topics of genetics and anthropology, director Carylanna Taylor has a background as an anthropologist and Harvard researcher Ruth McCole served as scientific consultant. The genetic lab scenes in the film were shot in the real Dr. Andreas Pfenning’s genetics lab at Carnegie Mellon University in Pittsburgh.

Synopsis 
Libby desperately wants a child, but has had trouble conceiving and has suffered multiple miscarriages. Her partner Marco believes that the issues stem from him, as he is convinced that he is suffering from an ancient curse that was placed on all of the people from his island. Nevertheless, he agrees to visit a geneticist with Libby to determine the issue. They are both shocked when they discover that the reason they cannot have children is because Marco's genetics differ to the point where he can be considered a different species. Each would be able to have a baby with their own kind, but together conceiving would be practically impossible.

Cast
 Ali Ahn as Libby
 Gil Perez-Abraham as Marco
 Izzabella Timonera as Anya
 Motell Gyn Foster as Dr. Seymour Livingston
 Anthony Aguilar as Aquiles
 Mary Theresa Archbold as Terry
 Diego A. Arellano as Hector
 Ana Maria Jomolca as Sara
 Ana Kayne as Fausta
 Olivia Oguma as Rika Endo
 Barbara Rosenblat as Dr. Rosalind Pfenning

Critical reception 
Film Inquiry called it "ambitious" and praised the chemistry between the main characters. Film Frenzy found the film "intriguing" and also noted the performances, but found the score "unnecessary and overbearing". Film Threat said Anya is "a good conversation starter at parties" in relation to its ideas about genetics and humanity but found the story frustrating at times.

References

External links 

 
 ANYA official website

2019 films
2010s science fiction films
2010s English-language films